Scott Lew was an American film director, producer and screenwriter who suffered from ALS.

Lew wrote the script for Sexy Evil Genius, starring Seth Green and Michelle Trachtenberg. He is also the subject of the documentary film Jujitsu-ing Reality, released in 2013.

Lew also directed and wrote the 2006 film Bickford Shmeckler's Cool Ideas.

References

External links

Scott Lew's Blog
Scott Lew, Inspirational Screenwriter Who Fought ALS to the End, Dies at 48

American male screenwriters
American film directors
American film producers
1968 births
2017 deaths
University of Michigan alumni
Neurological disease deaths in California
Deaths from motor neuron disease